Edamon is a village in Punalur taluk in Kollam district in the state of Kerala, India.

Demographics
 India census, Edamon had a population of 12453 with 5980 males and 6473 females. The population has reduced to 12,029 with 5,652 males (47%) and 6,377 females (53%) as per the survey of census during 2011 by Indian Government.

References

Villages in Kollam district